Trading Up may refer to: 

In literature:
 Trading Up (book), a 1995 book on political economy by David Vogel  
 Trading Up (novel), a 2003 novel by Candace Bushnell
 Trading Up: The New American Luxury, a business book co-authored by Neil Fiske

In television:
 Series:
 Trading Up, a 2000s UK television series presented by Colin McAllister and Justin Ryan
 Trading Up, a 2010s UK television series presented by Mike Brewer
 Episodes:
 Trading Up, a 1979 episode of Working Stiffs
 Trading Up, a 2009 episode of Family Biz
 Trading Up, a 2011 episode of American Pickers